The Branch MRT line was originally the third Mass Rapid Transit (MRT) line in Singapore, initially operated as a branch to the existing East West line. Travelling from one end of this line to the other end took about ten minutes, and the line was coloured brown and khaki on the rail map. The line is now part of the North South line, making it the first and  only defunct line in Singapore.

The line used to terminate at the centre track at Jurong East (then platforms C/D, now D/E). Trains operated at a six-minute frequency.

History
The line was conceptualized as the Western line during the early planning stages of the Singapore MRT network.

On 7 January 1986, the Taiwanese RSEA International and Hock Lian Seng Joint Venture were awarded the contract for the Branch MRT line stations – Bukit Batok, Bukit Gombak, and Choa Chu Kang.

The line started operations on 10 March 1990, and was named the Branch line, consisting of four stations. The line was subsequently merged into the North South line when the North South line Woodlands Extension opened on 10 February 1996, connecting the existing North South line at Yishun to the Branch line at Choa Chu Kang.
The station codes for Bukit Batok to Choa Chu Kang stations were changed to N23, N22 and N21 respectively, subsequently to their current code on the North South line with the revamp of the system map on 31 July 2001.

Stations

References

Mass Rapid Transit (Singapore) lines
Standard gauge railways in Singapore
Railway lines opened in 1990
Railway lines closed in 1996